Barrister Mohammad Hidayatullah Khan (1927–7 April 2009) also known as Barrister Saheb was an Indian politician. He served as Speaker of the Bihar Legislative Assembly from March 27, 1989 to March 19,1990. He was Minister of Food and Civil Supplies in Bindeshwari Dubey ministry. Khan was Member of Bihar Legislative Assembly from Harsidhi Assembly constituency for 4 terms. He was associated with Indian National Congress. He was President of Bihar Pradesh Congress Committee from 1993 to 1994.

References 

1927 births
2009 deaths
Speakers of the Bihar Legislative Assembly
People from East Champaran district
Indian National Congress politicians from Bihar
Bihar MLAs 1972–1977
Bihar MLAs 1980–1985
Bihar MLAs 1985–1990